Albert John Kinsey (born 19 September 1945) is an English former footballer. His regular position was as a forward. He was born in Liverpool. He played for Manchester United and Wrexham. Albert Kinsey played a major role in Wrexham's promotion to League Division 3 in season 1969–1970, finishing as leading scorer in the Football League, with 27 goals. Three years later, he became the first player to score a goal in European competition for Wrexham, helping them to draw 1–1 at F.C.Zurich, who were eventually defeated 3–2 on aggregate. He later joined Crewe Alexandra before dropping into non-league football with Wigan Athletic, where he scored one goal in five Northern Premier League games in the 1973–74 season.

References

External links
 MUFCInfo.com profile
 

1945 births
English footballers
Manchester United F.C. players
Wrexham A.F.C. players
Living people
Wigan Athletic F.C. players
English Football League players
Crewe Alexandra F.C. players
Association football forwards